Eric Scott Reed (born June 21, 1970) is an American jazz pianist and composer. His group Black Note released several albums in the 1990s.

Biography
Reed was born in Philadelphia, Pennsylvania. He began playing piano at age two, was playing piano in his minister father's church by age five, and at age seven began formal study at Philadelphia's Settlement Music School. At age 11 his family moved to Los Angeles, and he studied at the R. D. Colburn School of Arts.

In May 1986, at Colburn School, Reed met Wynton Marsalis, an encounter that would greatly aid his career. At age 18, during a year of college at California State University, Northridge, Reed briefly toured with Marsalis. He joined Marsalis's septet a year later, and worked with him from 1990 to 1991 (in 1991–1992 he worked with Joe Henderson and Freddie Hubbard), and again from 1992 to 1995. He later worked with the Lincoln Center Jazz Orchestra for two years (1996–1998), and led his own group in 1999.

Reed has worked with Robert Stewart, Irvin Mayfield, Cassandra Wilson, Mary Stallings, Clark Terry, Dianne Reeves, Elvin Jones, Ron Carter, Paula West, and Benny Carter. In 2010 he joined the Christian McBride combo Inside Straight, which produced the album Kind of Brown.

Reed has also worked as a composer, scoring music for independent and mainstream films, including the comedy Life, featuring Eddie Murphy and Martin Lawrence.

Three of his albums have charted on the Billboard' Top Jazz Albums chart: 1995's The Swing and I (peak No. 22); 1998's Pure Imagination (peak No. 8); and 1999's Manhattan Melodies (peak No. 21).

Discography

As leader
 1990 Soldier's Hymn (Candid)
 1993 It's All Right to Swing (MoJazz)
 1994 The Swing and I (MoJazz)
 1995 West Coast Jazz Summit (Mons) with Ralph Moore, Robert Hurst, Jeff Hamilton
 1996 Musicale (Impulse!/GRP) with Nicholas Payton, Wycliffe Gordon, Wessell Anderson, Ron Carter
 1997 Pure Imagination (Impulse!/GRP)
 1999 Manhattan Melodies (Impulse!/GRP)
 2000 Happiness (Nagel-Heyer)
 2000 EBop (Savant) [rel. 2003]
 2001 Mercy and Grace (Nagel-Heyer) [rel. 2003]
 2001 WE (Nagel-Heyer) [rel. 2001] with Wycliffe Gordon
 2002 From My Heart (Savant)
 2003 Cleopatra's Dream (M&I/Pony Canyon)
 2003 Merry Magic (Maxjazz)
 2004 Impressive & Romantic: The Great Composers We Love (M&I/Pony Canyon)
 2005 Blue Trane (M&I/Pony Canyon)
 2005 Here (Maxjazz) [rel. 2006]
 2006 Blue Monk (M&I/Pony Canyon)
 2006 WE 2 (WJ3) [rel. 2007] with Wycliffe Gordon
 2008 Stand! (WJ3) [rel. 2009]
 2009 Plenty Swing, Plenty Soul (Savant) [rel. 2010] with Cyrus Chestnut
 2011 The Dancing Monk (Savant)
 2011 Something Beautiful (WJ3)
 2012 The Baddest Monk (Savant)
 2013 Reflections of a Grateful Heart (WJ3)
 2014 The Adventurous Monk (Savant)
 2014 Groovewise (Smoke Sessions)

As sideman
With Wynton Marsalis
 1992 Citi Movement (Columbia)
 1994 Blood on the Fields (Columbia) [rel. 1995]
 1994 Joe Cool's Blues (Columbia) [rel. 1995]
 1994 Standard Time, Vol. 4: Marsalis Plays Monk (Columbia) [rel. 1999]
 1999 Standard Time, Vol. 6: Mr. Jelly Lord (Columbia)
 1999 Live at the Village Vanguard (Columbia)

With Robert Stewart
 Judgement (World Stage, 1994; Red, 1997)
With Arkadia Jazz All Stars
 Thank You, Joe! (Our Tribute to Joe Henderson) (Arkadia Jazz, 1999)
With Christian McBride
 Kind of Brown (Mack Avenue, 2009)

References

External links

Official Website
New York Times review
Profile at AllAboutJazz.com
[ Eric Reed] at Allmusic.com

1970 births
Living people
American jazz composers
American jazz pianists
American male pianists
Musicians from Philadelphia
Impulse! Records artists
Candid Records artists
Jazz musicians from Pennsylvania
21st-century American pianists
American male jazz composers
21st-century American male musicians
Black Note members
WJ3 Records artists
Nagel-Heyer Records artists
GRP Records artists
Smoke Sessions Records artists